The García de León family is an extended Mexican grand family. They are one of the most influential families in Mexican politics and business. The Garcia de Leon and their descendants have consistently produced political dynasties. They can be compared to the Kennedy family and the Bush family of the United States.

Notable family members
Many Garcia de Leon family members are influential in local or national business and politics in Mexico, the US, and France.

José Antonio Meade Kuribreña
Dionisio Meade y Garcia de Leon
, spouse of Raquel Garcia de Leon y Avellaneda
Alfredo de Sarachaga, spouse of Lidia Garcia de Leon y Avellaneda
Luis Maximilano Meade, spouse of Gracia Garcia de Leon y Avellaneda
Mauricio de Maria y Campos, spouse of Patricia Meade y Garcia de Leon

References

Political families of Mexico